Antonio Burks may refer to:

 Antonio Burks (basketball, born 1980), American former NBA player
 Antonio Burks (basketball, born 1982), American former player in Japan and Canada